Michel Hansenne  ( in Belgium).  He studied law and became a labour activist turned Belgium politician.  In 1989 he was the first Director-General of the International Labour Organization since the end of the cold war. As Director-General, he was preceded by Francis Blanchard and succeeded by Juan Somavía. In 1999 he was elected as a Member of the European Parliament (MEP) from Belgium a post he held till 2004.

Early life
Michel Hansenne was born on March 23, 1940. At the age of 23, Hansenne obtained a Doctor of Law, subsequently gaining a degree in Economics and Finance from the University of Liège. In 1962, Hansenne began working at the University of Liège as a researcher before beginning his career in politics in 1972.

Belgium politics

In 1974, he became a member of the Parliament of Belgium, becoming Minister for French Culture from 1979–1981, Minister for Employment and Labour from 1981–1988 and Minister for Civil Service from 1988–1989.

ILO and MEP

In 1989, Hansenne was elected the first post-Cold War Director-General of the International Labour Organization. Four years later, in 1993, Hansenne was elected for a second term. In 1997, during his time as Director-General of the ILO, Hansenne called for the certification of countries which adhere to his organisation's labour standards. In 1999, he was elected a Member of the European Parliament representing Belgium, the same year publishing a book, Un garde-fou pour la mondialisation. Le BIT dans l'après-guerre froide. Hansenne's European Parliamentary career was as a member of the Group of the European People's Party (Christian Democrats).

Whilst a Member of the European Parliament, Hansenne served on the Committee on Industry, External Trade, Research and Energy and the Delegation for relations with Japan, serving as a substitute on the Committee on Constitutional Affairs and Committee on Regional Policy, Transport and Tourism.

Works published

In 1999 he wrote and published the book about the history of the ILO and how he navigated the changing times: 
- Total pages: 151

References 

1940 births
Living people
MEPs for Belgium 1999–2004
International Labour Organization people
Belgian officials of the United Nations